I Was Impaled is an hour-long reality television docuseries show which depicts incidents in which real people were impaled on nonhuman objects and yet survived. Each hour-long show consists of four separate episodes. It is produced by a British production company entitled Twofour, and shown in the United States on the Discovery Fit & Health channel. and the show will air in Europe, the Middle East, Africa and Latin America under the name Body Invaders. Foreign objects which punctured human bodies include fence posts, garden shears, bicycle pole. The show chronicles the medical rescue involving first responders such as emergency medical technicians as well as doctors who saved the person's life.

Reception
Chicago Tribune critic A. J. Marechal described the show as "bizarre tales of objects being ingested or impaling people's bodies." Critics for National Public Radio, when they first learned of the title of the show, wondered whether it was "some kind of rogue intern prank". New York Times critic Neil Genzlinger found the title, itself, to be "jolting". The Oregonian critic Kristi Turnquist thought the show sounded like an "April Fool's joke", but noted how with "cutting edge animation", the show shows "everything", including the horrifying moment of entry to elation at removal of the object. She wrote:

Feminist critic Gwendolyn Audrey Foster described the show as "almost entirely shorn of narrative and any sense of morality." She elaborated:

References

American medical television series
American reality television series